T.I. is an American rapper, producer, actor, and the co-CEO of Grand Hustle Records. He won his first award in 2003 when he received Best Collaboration with fellow hip hop artist Bone Crusher for the song "Never Scared" at the Source Awards. In 2004, he received two wins from six nominations, including Best Street Anthem for "Rubberband Man" at the Vibe Awards. In 2005, he received one award from 13 nominations, that being his second consecutive Best Street Anthem award, this time for the song "U Don't Know Me"

T.I. received 18 wins from 37 nominations in 2006, including Male Hip Hop Artist of the Year at the Black Entertainment Television (BET) Awards, Hip Hop MVP of the Year at the BET Hip Hop Awards, Rap Artist of the Year at the Billboard Music Awards, Best Rap Artist at the Ozone Awards. For the entire year of 2007, T.I. received 16 wins from 41 nominations, including his first two Grammy wins at the 49th Annual Grammy Awards, one for the single "What You Know" (Best Rap Solo Performance) and one for American pop singer Justin Timberlake's number-one single "My Love" (Best Rap/Sung Collaboration), Favorite Male Hip Hop Artist and Favorite Rap/Hip Hop album for T.I. vs. T.I.P. at the American Music Awards, Best Hip Hop Male at the BET Awards for the second consecutive year, and Rap Artist of the Year at the Billboard Music Awards.

In 2008, T.I. received two wins from 11 nominations, including Most Performed Song for "My Love" at the ASCAP Pop Music Awards. In 2009, T.I. received 11 wins from 31 nominations, including Top R&B/Hip Hop Male Artist of the Decade at The Billboard Music Awards, Best Rap Performance by a Duo or Group for "Swagga Like Us" at the 51st Annual Grammy Awards, and Best Male Video for "Live Your Life" at the MTV Video Music Awards. Overall, T.I. has earned 64 awards from 170 nominations.

American Music Awards 
The American Music Awards are awarded for outstanding achievements for American artists in the record industry. T.I. has won two awards from nine nominations.

|-
|rowspan="1"|2005
|Urban Legend
|Favorite Rap/Hip Hop Album
|
|-
|rowspan="2"|2006
|T.I.
|Favorite Rap/Hip Male Artist
|
|-
|KING
|Favorite Rap/Hip Hop Album
|
|-
|rowspan="2"|2007
|T.I.
|Favorite Rap/Hip Hop Male Artist
|
|-
|T.I. vs. T.I.P.
|Favorite Rap/Hip Hop Album
|
|-
|rowspan="3"|2009
|Paper Trail
|Favorite Album for Rap/Hip Hop
|
|-
|rowspan="2"|T.I.
|Favorite Rap/Hip Hop Artist
|
|-
|Favorite Rock/Pop Artist
|
|-
|rowspan="1"|2013
|"Blurred Lines"  (with Robin Thicke and Pharrell Williams) 
|Single of the Year
|
|-

ASCAP Music Awards 
The ASCAP Awards are held annually by the American Society of Composers, Authors and Publishers.

ASCAP Pop Music Awards 
The annual ASCAP Pop Music Awards honors the songwriters and publishers of the most performed pop songs. T.I. has won five awards.

|-
|rowspan="1"|2006
|"Soldier"
|Most Performed Song
|
|-
|rowspan="1"|2007
|"Grillz""My Love""What You Know"
|Most Performed Songs
|
|-
|rowspan="1"|2008
|"My Love"
|Most Performed Song
|
|-
|rowspan="1"|2009
|"Live Your Life"
|Most Performed Song
|
|-
|rowspan="1"|2010
|"Dead and Gone""Live Your Life"
|Most Performed Song
|

ASCAP Rhythm & Soul Music Awards 
The annual ASCAP Rhythm & Soul Music Awards honors songwriters and publishers of top R&B, hip hop, and reggae music. T.I. has won eight awards.

|-
|rowspan="2"|2006
|"Soldier""Bring Em Out""U Don't Know Me"
|Top Hip Hop/R&B song
|
|-
|"Bring Em Out""U Don't Know Me"
|Top Rap Song
|
|-
|rowspan="2"|2007
|"What You Know""Why You Wanna""Grillz"
|Top Hip Hop/R&B song
|
|-
|"Grillz""What You Know""Why You Wanna"
|Top Rap Song
|
|-
|rowspan="1"|2008
|"My Love"
|Top Hip Hop/R&B song
|
|-
|rowspan="2"|2010
|"Dead and Gone"  "Just Like Me"  "Live Your Life"
|Award Winning Hip Hop/R&B song
|
|-
|"Dead and Gone""Live Your Life"
|Award winning Rap Song
|
|-
|rowspan="1"|2011
|"Fancy"
|Award Winning Hip Hop/R&B song
|
|-

Barbados Music Awards 
The Barbados Music Awards is an annual award ceremony that honors the best in Barbadian music. T.I. has received one nomination.

|-
|rowspan="1"|2009
|"Live Your Life"
|Best Collaboration
|

BET Awards 
The BET Awards were established in 2001 by the Black Entertainment Television network to celebrate African Americans and other minorities in music, acting, sports, and other fields of entertainment. T.I. has won three awards from twelve nominations.

|-
|rowspan="3"|2005
|rowspan="2"|"Soldier" (with Destiny's Child & Lil Wayne)
|Best Collaboration
|
|-
|Viewer's Choice
|
|-
|T.I.
|Best Hip Hop Male
|
|-
|rowspan="2"|2006
|T.I.
|Best Male Hip Hop Artist
|
|-
|"What You Know"
|Viewer's Choice
|
|-
|rowspan="1"|2007
|T.I.
|Best Male Hip Hop Artist
|
|-
|rowspan="5"|2009
|T.I.
|Best Male Hip Hop Artist
|
|-
|rowspan="3"|"Live Your Life" (with Rihanna)
|Viewer's Choice Award
|
|-
|Video of the Year
|
|-
|rowspan="2"|Best Collaboration
|
|-
|"Ain't I" (with Yung L.A. & Young Dro)
|
|-
|rowspan="1"|2011
|Takers
|Best Movie
|
|-
|rowspan="1"|2014
|"Blurred Lines" (with Robin Thicke & Pharrell Williams) 
|Best Collaboration
|

BET Hip Hop Awards 
The BET Hip Hop Awards are an annual awards show, hosted by BET, for hip hop performers, producers and music video directors. The awards ceremony debuted in 2006. T.I. has won nine awards from thirty nominations.

|-
|rowspan="9"|2006
|rowspan="4"|T.I.
|Best Live Performer
|
|-
|Hip Hop MVP of the Year
|
|-
|Element Award: Lyricist Of the Year
|
|-
|Hustler of the Year
|
|-
|KING
|Hip Hop Video CD of the Year
|
|-
|rowspan="2"|"Shoulder Lean"
|Best Hip Hop Collabo of the Year
|
|-
|BET Hot Ringtone Award
|
|-
|rowspan="2"|"What You Know"
|Best Hip Hop Track of the Year
|
|-
|Hip Hop Video of the Year
|
|-
|rowspan="8"|2007
|"We Takin' Over"
|Attel's People Wireless Champ
|
|-
|T.I. vs. T.I.P.
|Hip Hop CD of the Year (Tied with Common's Finding Forever)
|
|-
|rowspan="3"|"Big Things Poppin' (Do It)"
|Hip Hop Video of the Year
|
|-
|Hip Hop Track of the Year
|
|-
|Best Ringtone
|
|-
|rowspan="3"|T.I.
|Lyricist of the Year
|
|-
|Best Live Performer
|
|-
|Hustler of the Year
|
|-
|rowspan="3"|2008
|rowspan="3"|T.I.
|Best Live Performer
|
|-
|Best Lyricist
|
|-
|Hip Hop MVP of the Year
|
|-
|rowspan="6"|2009
|rowspan="2"|T.I.
|Best Live Performer
|
|-
|Hip Hop MVP of the Year
|
|-
|Paper Trail
|Hip Hop CD of the Year
|
|-
|rowspan="3"|"Live Your Life"
|Track of the Year
|
|-
|Hip Hop Collaboration
|
|-
|Hip Hop Video of the Year
|
|-
|rowspan="3"|2010
|rowspan="2"|T.I.
|Hustler of the Year
|
|-
|Made You Look Award
|
|-
|"Hello Good Morning"
|Best Club Banger
|
|-
|rowspan="1"|2012
|"Magic" (remix)
|Sweet 16
|
|-
|rowspan="1"|2013
|T.I.
|Hustler of the Year
|
|-
|rowspan="2"|2014
|rowspan="2"|T.I.
|Best Live Performer
|
|-
|Hustler of the Year
|
|-

Billboard Awards 
The Billboard Music Awards were sponsored by Billboard Magazine and was held annually in December. The awards were based on sales data by Nielsen SoundScan and radio information by Nielsen Broadcast Data Systems. T.I. has won twelve awards from twenty nominations.

|-
|rowspan="8"|2006||T.I.||Rap Artist of the Year||
|-
||KING||Rap Album of the Year||
|-
||T.I.||Rap Album Artist of the Year||
|-
||T.I.||Rap Song Artist of the Year||
|-
||T.I.||Video Clip Artist of the Year||
|-
||T.I.||R&B/Hip Hop Artist of the Year||
|-
||T.I.||R&B/Hip Hop Artist of the Year (Male)||
|-
||KING||R&B/Hip Hop Album of the Year||
|-
|rowspan="7"|2007||T.I.||Rap Artist of the Year||
|-
||T.I. vs. T.I.P.||Rap Album of the Year||
|-
||T.I.||Rap Song Artist of the Year||
|-
||T.I.||Video Clip Artist of the Year||
|-
||T.I.||R&B/Hip Hop Artist of the Year||
|-
||T.I.||R&B/Hip Hop Artist of the Year (Male)||
|-
||T.I. vs. T.I.P.||Rap/Hip Hop Album of the Year||
|-
|rowspan="4"|2009||T.I.||Male Artist of the Decade||
|-
||T.I.||Top R&B/Hip Hop Male Artist of the Decade||
|-
||T.I.||Top Rap Song Artist of the Decade||
|-
||T.I.||Top Hot Song Artist of the Year||
|-
|rowspan="1"|2013||Blurred Lines (as featured artist)||Top Hot 100 Song||

Billboard Hip Hop/R&B Awards 
The Billboard R&B/Hip-Hop Awards reflect the performance of recordings on the Hot R&B/Hip-Hop Songs and Hot Rap Tracks. T.I. has won one award out of four nominations.

|-
|rowspan="2"|2006
|T.I.
|Best R&B/Hip Hop Artist Male
|
|-
|KING
|Best Rap Album
|
|-
|rowspan="2"|2007
|T.I.
|Best R&B/Hip Hop Artist Male
|
|-
|T.I. vs. T.I.P.
|Best Rap Album
|

BMI Urban Awards 
BMI is one of three United States performing rights organizations, along with ASCAP and SESAC. It collects license fees on behalf of songwriters, composers, and music publishers and distributes them as royalties to those members whose works have been performed. T.I. has won nine times.

|-
|rowspan="2"|2006
|"What You Know""Grillz"
|2006 Billboard #1's
|
|-
|"Soldier"
|Award Winning Songs
|
|-
|rowspan="2"|2007
|"Grillz""Shoulder Lean""My Love""What You Know"
|Award Winning Songs
|
|-
|"Grillz"
|Award Winning Pop Songs
|
|-
|rowspan="2"|2008
|"I'm a Flirt"
|Award Winning Songs
|
|-
|"My Love"
|Award Winning Pop Songs
|
|-
|rowspan="1"|2009
|"Live Your Life""Whatever You Like""You Know What It Is"
|Award Winning Songs
|
|-
|rowspan="2"|2010
|"Ain't I""Dead and Gone""Live Your Life"
|Most Performed Urban Songs of the Year
|
|-
|"Dead and Gone" "Live Your Life" "Whatever You Like"
|Award Winning Pop Songs
|

Grammy Awards 
The Grammy Awards are awarded annually by the National Academy of Recording Arts and Sciences. T.I. has won three awards out of nineteen nominations.

|-
|rowspan="2"|2006
||"Soldier" (with Destiny's Child & Lil Wayne)||Best Rap/Sung Collaboration||
|-
|"U Don't Know Me"
|rowspan="2"| Best Rap Solo Performance
|
|-
|rowspan="4"|2007
|rowspan="2"| "What You Know"
|
|-
|Best Rap Song
|
|-
|"My Love" (with Justin Timberlake)
|Best Rap/Sung Collaboration
|
|-
|King
|rowspan="2"| Best Rap Album
|
|-
|rowspan="3"|2008
|T.I. vs. T.I.P.
|
|-
|rowspan="2"| "Big Things Poppin' (Do It)"
|Best Rap Solo Performance
|
|-
|rowspan="2"| Best Rap Song
|
|-
|rowspan="4"|2009
|rowspan="2"| "Swagga Like Us" (with Jay-Z, Kanye West & Lil Wayne)
|
|-
|rowspan="2"| Best Rap Performance by a Duo or Group
|
|-
|"Wish You Would" (with Ludacris)
|
|-
|Paper Trail
|Best Rap Album
|
|-
|rowspan="2"|2010
|rowspan="2"| "Dead and Gone" (with Justin Timberlake)
|Best Rap/Sung Collaboration
|
|-
|Best Rap Song
|
|-
|rowspan="2"|2011
|"I'm Back"
|Best Rap Solo Performance
|
|-
|"Fancy" (with Drake & Swizz Beatz)
|Best Rap Performance by a Duo or Group
|
|-
|rowspan="2"|2014
|rowspan="2"| "Blurred Lines" (with Robin Thicke & Pharrell Williams)
|Record of the Year
|
|-
|Best Pop Duo/Group Performance
|
|-

MOBO Awards, UK 
The Music of Black Origin Awards, established in 1995 by Kanya King MBE and Andy Ruffell, are held annually in the United Kingdom to recognise artists of any race or nationality performing black music. T.I. was nominated once.

|-
|rowspan="1"|2007
|T.I.
|Best International Act
|

MTV Awards

VMA 
The MTV Video Music Awards were established in 1984 by MTV to celebrate the top music videos of the year. T.I. has won one award out of nine nominations.

|-
|rowspan="1"|2005
|"U Don't Know Me"
|Best Rap Video
|
|-
|rowspan="2"|2006
|rowspan="2"|"What You Know"
|Best Male Video
|
|-
|Best Rap Video
|
|-
|rowspan="1"|2007
|T.I.
|Male Artist of the Year
|
|-
|rowspan="1"|2008
|"No Matter What"
|Best Male Video
|
|-
|rowspan="1"|2009
|"Live Your Life"
|Best Male Video
|
|-
|rowspan="3"|2013
|rowspan="3"|"Blurred Lines"
|Video of the Year
|
|-
|Best Male Video
|
|-
|Best Collaboration
|
|-

MTV Australia Awards 
The MTV Australia Awards started in 2005 and is Australia's first awards show to celebrate both local and international acts. T.I. has won one award.

|-
|rowspan="1"|2009
|"Live Your Life"
|Best Collaboration
|

EMA 
The MTV Europe Music Awards were established in 1994 by MTV Europe to celebrate the most popular music videos in Europe. T.I. was nominated four times.

|-
|rowspan="1"|2009
|T.I.
|Best Urban
|
|-
|rowspan="1"|2010
|T.I.
|Best Hip Hop
|
|-
|rowspan="2"|2013
|rowspan="2"|"Blurred Lines"
|Best Song
|
|-
|Best Video
|

MTV Video Music Awards Japan 
The MTV Video Music Awards Japan started in 2002. T.I. was nominated four times.

|-
|rowspan="1"|2007
|"What You Know"
|Best Video
|
|-
|rowspan="2"|2009
|rowspan="2"|"Live Your Life"
|Best Hip Hop Video
|
|-
|Best Collaboration
|
|-
|rowspan="1"|2013
|"Back 2 Life (Live It Up)"
|Best Reggae Video
|

MuchMusic Video Awards, CAN 
The MuchMusic Video Awards is an annual awards ceremony presented by the Canadian music video channel MuchMusic. T.I. has been nominated once.

|-
|rowspan="1"|2009
|"Live Your Life"
|International Video (Artist)
|

NAACP Image Awards 
An NAACP Image Award is an accolade presented by the American National Association for the Advancement of Colored People to honor outstanding people of color in film, television, music, and literature. T.I. was nominated twice.

|-
|rowspan="2"|2014
|rowspan="2"|"Blurred Lines"
|Outstanding Duo, Group or Collaboration
|
|-
|Outstanding Song
|
|-

Ozone Awards 
The first annual Ozone Awards were held on August 6, 2006. The awards were determined for great success in Southern Hip Hop. T.I. has won two awards out of ten nominations.

|-
|rowspan="5"|2006
|KING
|Best Rap Album
|
|-
|"What You Know"
|Best Club Banger
|
|-
|rowspan="3"|T.I.
|Best Rap Artist
|
|-
|Best Lyricist
|
|-
|TJ's DJ's Tastemaker Award
|
|-
|rowspan="3"|2007
|rowspan="3"|T.I.
|TJ's DJ's Hustler Award
|
|-
|Best Rap Artist (Male)
|
|-
|TJ's DJ's Tastemaker Award
|
|-
|rowspan="2"|2008
|rowspan="2"|T.I.
|Best Rap Artist
|
|-
|Best Lyricist
|

People's Choice Awards 
The People's Choice Awards is an annual awards show recognizing the people and the work of popular culture. T.I. was nominated 3 times.

|-
|rowspan="2"|2010
|T.I.
|Hip Hop Artist of the Year
|
|-
|"Live Your Life"
|Favorite Music Collaboration
|
|-
|2015
|T.I.
|Favorite Hip-Hop Artist
|
|}

Soul Train Music Awards 
The Soul Train Music Awards is an annual award show which previously aired in national television syndication, and honors the best in Black music and entertainment. T.I. has won two awards out of five nominations.

|-
|rowspan="1"|2010
|"Got Your Back"
|Best Hip Hop Song of the Year
|
|-
|rowspan="4"|2013
|rowspan="4"|"Blurred Lines"
|Song of the Year
|
|-
|Best Dance Performance
|
|-
|Video of the Year
|
|-
|Best Collaboration
|
|-

Source Awards 
The first live Source Hip-Hop Music Awards show was held in 1994. T.I. has won one award from five nominations.

|-
|rowspan="1"|2003
|"Never Scared"
|Single of the Year Collaboration
|
|-
|rowspan="4"|2004
|rowspan="2"|T.I.
|Breakthrough Artist of the Year
|
|-
|Lyricist of the Year
|
|-
|"Rubberband Man (remix)"
|Remix of the Year
|
|-
|"Round Here"
|Single of the Year Collaboration
|

Southern Entertainment Award (SEA) 
The Southern Entertainment Awards recognize those responsible for contributing to the growth of Southern Hip Hop. T.I. won two awards from three nominations.

|-
|rowspan="1"|2004
|T.I.
|Southern Mixtape Artist Of the Year
|
|-
|rowspan="1"|2005
|T.I.
|Artist of the Year
|
|-
|rowspan="1"|2009
|Club Crucial
|Nightclub/Venue of the Year
|

Teen Choice Awards 
The Teen Choice Awards is an awards show presented annually by the Fox Broadcasting Company. T.I. was nominated eleven times.

|-
|rowspan="3"|2005
|"Bring Em Out"
|Choice Rap Track
|
|-
|"Soldier"
|Choice R&B/Rap Track
|
|-
|T.I.
|Choice Breakout Artist
|
|-
|rowspan="2"|2006
|rowspan="2"|T.I.
|Choice Rap Artist
|
|-
|Choice Male Artist
|
|-
|rowspan="2"|2007
|rowspan="2"|T.I.
|Rap Artist
|
|-
|Choice Male Artist
|
|-
|rowspan="1"|2009
|"Live Your Life"
|Hook Up Track
|
|-
|rowspan="1"|2010
|"Hello Good Morning"
|Rap/Hip-Hop Track
|
|-
|rowspan="2"|2013
|rowspan="2"|"Blurred Lines"
|Choice Summer Song
|
|-
|Choice Single: Male Artist
|
|-

Urban Music Awards 
The Urban Music Awards is a HipHop, R&B, Dance and soul music awards ceremony launched in 2003 and now held in six countries annually. T.I. was nominated two times.

|-
|rowspan="2"|2007
|rowspan="2"|T.I.
|Most Inspiring Act
|
|-
|Best Hip Hop Act
|

Vibe Awards 
The Vibe Awards are an annual award ceremony that honor hip hop, R&B and soul musicians. T.I. has won two awards from nine nominations.

|-
|rowspan="1"|2004
|"Rubberband Man"
|Best Street Anthem
|
|-
|rowspan="4"|2005
|"U Don't Know Me"
|Best Street Anthem
|
|-
|T.I.
|Best Rapper
|
|-
|"Bring Em Out"
|Club Banger
|
|-
|"Soldier"
|Coolest Collaboration
|
|-
|rowspan="4"|2007
|"We Takin' Over"
|Best Collaboration
|
|-
|rowspan="3"|T.I.
|Hip Hop Artist of the Year
|
|-
|V-Style
|
|-
|V-Hollywood
|

World Music Awards 
The World Music Awards was established in 1989 and is an international awards show that annually honors musicians based on their worldwide sales figures, which are provided by the International Federation of the Phonographic Industry. T.I. was nominated eleven times.

|-
|rowspan="1"|2006
|T.I.
|World's Best Selling Rap/Hip Hop Artist
|
|-
|rowspan="1"|2008
|T.I.
|World's Best Selling Rap/Hip Hop Artist
|
|-
|rowspan="7"|2013
|rowspan="2"|"2 Reasons"
|World's Best Song
|
|-
|World's Best Video
|
|-
|rowspan="2"|"Blurred Lines"
|World's Best Song
|
|-
|World's Best Video
|
|-
|rowspan="3"|"T.I."
|World's Best Male Award
|
|-
|World's Best Live Act
|
|-
|World's Best Entertainer of the Year
|
|-
| rowspan="2" | 2014
| rowspan="2" | "Coke Bottle" (Agnez Mo feat. Timbaland & T.I.)
| World's Best Song
| 
|-
| World's Best Video
| 
|-

References 

Awards
T.I.